Bianca Bai (born 23 October 1982) is a Taiwanese actress and model.

Bai graduated from Shih Hsin University and started her career as a model with Catwalk Modeling Agency before becoming an actress. She was nominated in 2010 for Best Actress at the 45th Golden Bell Awards for her role in Shining Days.

In June 2016, Bai gave birth to a boy.

Filmography

Television series

Film

References

External links

1982 births
Living people
Taiwanese female models
Actresses from Taipei
Taiwanese television actresses
Shih Hsin University alumni
Taiwanese film actresses
Taiwanese people of Japanese descent
21st-century Taiwanese actresses